The 1984–85 Dallas Sidekicks season was the inaugural season of the Dallas Sidekicks professional indoor soccer club.

Roster

Schedule and results

Preseason

Regular season

Final standings

y – division champions, x – clinched playoff berth

External links
 1984-85 Dallas Sidekicks season at Kicks Fan fansite

Dallas Sidekicks (1984–2004) seasons
Dallas Sidekicks
Dallas Sidekicks
American soccer clubs 1984 season
American soccer clubs 1985 season